UHA may refer to:

Ukrainian Galician Army
Union Hispano Americana
University Heights Academy
University of Upper Alsace
Up Helly Aa, a number of fire festivals held in Shetland, Scotland